The Palmerston Football Club, nicknamed, Magpies, is an Australian rules football club, currently playing in the Northern Territory Football League. They were first called Internationals before entering the NTFL, then they were called North Darwin from the 1972/73 to 1995/96 season.

Club achievements

History
The Palmerston Magpies Football Club began in 1970 and was originally known as the Internationals. At that time most players were English and Greek soccer players. John O'Donoghue and Paul Fricker got the started with  John doing the ground work while Paul represented the club at NTFL meetings. In 1971, the club was informed by the NTFL executive to field three teams and to change its name to a more suitable football name, hence Nth Darwin was born.

In 1972 club was renamed North Darwin Football Club, with the club winning a premiership in 1980/81 under the leadership of Coach Ian Smith and Captain John Stokes (father of AFL footballer Mathew Stokes). North Darwin Football Club moved to Palmerston in the 1995/1996 season and became the Palmerston Magpies Incorporated the following season, at which time the club moved to Palmerston to play home games for 1 season at Archer Oval. Following a move back to Marrara as our home ground, the club played in 4 grand finals 1999/2000 to 2002/2003 and won 2 premierships in 2000/2001 and 2001/2002.

Palmerston Magpies is the only club in the NTFL that represents its own City. The City of Palmerston is located 21 km south of Darwin. The Magpies home ground is the Cazalys Oval, a $2 million facility located at Charles Darwin University Palmerston Campus.

The club has produced players for the AFL such as Aaron Davey, Alwyn Davey, Trent Hentschel, and Mathew Stokes.

Club song

External links

Official website
Full Points Footy Profile for Palmerston

Sport in Darwin, Northern Territory
Australian rules football clubs in the Northern Territory
1970 establishments in Australia
Australian rules football clubs established in 1970
Palmerston, Northern Territory